Khan-E-Azam (Punjabi) is a 1981 Pakistani, action, musical film, directed by Yunus Malik and produced by Suhail Ahmad Gaba. 

The film stars Sudhir, Sultan Rahi, Mustafa Qureshi, Aasia and Zahir Shah.

Cast 
 Sudhir as Khan-E-Azam
 Sultan Rahi as Nadir
 Mustafa Qureshi as Babar
 Aasia
 Nazli
 Bahar
 Zahir Shah
 Irfan Khoosat
 Jameel Babar
 Seema 
 Shakeel
 Iqbal Durrani
 Ladla
 Nasrullah Butt
 Irfan Khoost
 Azhar Khan
 Asim Qureshi

Soundtrack
The music of Khan-E-Azam is composed by Wajahat Attre,ref name=citwf/> with lyrics penned by Khawaja Pervez.

Track listing

References

External links 
 Film poster
 

Pakistani action drama films
Pakistani fantasy films
Punjabi-language Pakistani films
1980s fantasy action films
1980s Punjabi-language films